Dreams of Death and Dismay is Anata's second full-length album. It was released by Season of Mist Records.

Track listing
"Die Laughing" – 3:58
"Faith, Hope, Self-Deception" – 5:26
"God of Death" – 3:55
"Metamorphosis by the Well of Truth" - 4:37
"Dreamon" - 2:27
"Can't Kill What's Already Dead" - 3:38
"Insurrection" - 4:31
"The Enigma of Number Three" - 5:29
"Drain of Blood" - 3:59
"The Temple/Erratic" - 8:44

Personnel
 Fredrik Schälin - vocals, guitar
 Andreas Allenmark - guitar
 Henrik Drake - bass
 Robert Petersson - drums

2001 albums
Season of Mist albums
Anata (band) albums